Peter Sparling is a 20th-century American dancer and dance professor. He is a Thurnau professor and former chair of the University of Michigan Department of Dance and Artistic Director of his own Ann Arbor-based Peter Sparling Dance Company.

Dancer
A native of Detroit and graduate of the Interlochen Arts Academy and The Juilliard School, Sparling danced with the José Limón Dance Company from 1971-73. From 1973-87, he was a principal dancer with the Martha Graham Dance Company.

Choreographer, teacher, and director
Sparling also served as Martha Graham's choreographic assistant during his period with the Martha Graham Dance Company.  Since then, he has returned often to perform, coach, and teach. As a regisseur of the Martha Graham Trust, he has staged Graham's works on his own company and on companies all over the world.

Sparling presented Peter Sparling Dance Company and his solo performance, "Solo Flight", for five successive seasons at New York's Riverside Dance Festival from 1979-83. He has held residencies at the American Dance Festival, at numerous American universities and in London, Australia, Portugal, and Taiwan.

Grants and positions
Sparling is on the roster of the Fulbright Senior Specialists Program and a National Screening Committee Member for the Institute of International Education/US Graduate Student Fulbright Program. He was a faculty fellow with the first Rackham Summer Interdisciplinary Institute and a member of the UM Society of Fellows. A 2001-2 Interdisciplinary Faculty Associate at the Center for Research on Learning and Teaching, he has designed and co-taught a Videodance course for the past five years. He has written texts for performance and has had his poetry and articles published in the Michigan Quarterly Review and Choreography and Dance.  He choreographed and directed Gluck's opera, Orfeo ed Euridice, for the University Musical Society's 2001-2002 season.

Works
Sparling was commissioned by the Detroit Institute of Arts to create work for both the "Detroit 300: Artists Take on Detroit: Projects for the Tricentennial" and the exhibit, "Degas and the Dance". His solo show, "Bodytalk: A Vaudeville for Dancing Man at Middle Age", premiered at the 2002 Ann Arbor Summer Festival, featuring original text and video as well as a host of distinguished collaborators such as Linda Gregerson, Rudolf Arnheim, and Charles Baxter. His video/performance work, "Peninsula", received its premiere at the 2004 Ann Arbor Summer Festival and has toured throughout the state as well as to the Chicago Humanities Festival. It celebrates the cultural and economic history, geography, and diverse landscapes of his home state of Michigan. His videodance, "Babel", was selected for screening at the 2007 NY Dance on Camera Festival at Lincoln Center.  It also featured in his new videodance installation, Allegorica in November, 2007.  His work, Vox Humana, was premiered by the Grand Rapids Ballet in April 2008. His next project, Climbing Ste.-Victoire, was a full-evening dance/theater work inspired by the late paintings of Cézanne.

Awards
Sparling is a recipient of the 1998 Governor's Michigan Artist Award and grants from the National Endowment for the Arts, Michigan Council for Arts and Cultural Affairs and Arts Foundation of Michigan. Since coming to the University of Michigan in 1984, he received a Faculty Recognition Award and grants from OVPR, Rackham School for Graduate Studies, and the Office of the President. Sparling was a 2003 Michigan Road Scholar. Sparling was honored as a distinguished alumnus of Interlochen Center for the Arts for its 75th Anniversary.

Sparling received the Adaptive Re-Use Award from the Ann Arbor Historical Commission for a project that renovated a ball bearing factory along Ann Arbor's North Main St. corridor for the organization's new home.

Notes

External links
 Peter Sparling website
 University of Michigan faculty page

Year of birth missing (living people)
Living people
People from Detroit
Interlochen Center for the Arts alumni
Juilliard School alumni
University of Michigan faculty
American dancers